Crystal Simorgh for Best Film is an award presented annually by the Fajr International Film Festival held in Iran.

Winners and nominees

Most wins and nominations

Production companies

Notes

References 

Awards for best film
Film